Stuart Arundel is a former professional rugby league footballer and former board member at Featherstone Rovers. As of August 2014, he has worked at Beautiful Minds, Ltd. as a "creative partner."

In his playing career, Arundel played for the Leeds Rhinos, Halifax, and Featherstone Rovers. He was appointed to the Featherstone board of directors in September 2012, following his work on the club's marketing.

Arundel made his debut for Leeds, coming on as a substitute in a defeat by Hull F.C.

References

Living people
English rugby league players
Featherstone Rovers
Featherstone Rovers players
Halifax R.L.F.C. players
Leeds Rhinos players
Place of birth missing (living people)
Year of birth missing (living people)